Donald Martin "Smokey" McLeod (August 24, 1946 – March 11, 2015) was a Canadian professional ice hockey goaltender who played briefly in the National Hockey League and six full seasons in the World Hockey Association between 1970 and 1978.

Playing career
McLeod's professional career began with several teams in the minor Central Professional Hockey League and American Hockey League, before being called up for two stints in the NHL, totaling 18 games, with the Detroit Red Wings and Philadelphia Flyers over the 1970–71 and 1971–72 seasons.

With the formation of the WHA in 1972, McLeod was signed by the Houston Aeros, where he played two seasons. The 1973-74 season was his finest year.  He was the second winner of the Ben Hatskin Trophy as the WHA's top goalie and was named to the First All-Star team. To top off his best professional season, the Aeros won the Avco Trophy as WHA playoff champions. McLeod was also chosen to represent Canada in the 1974 Summit Series against the Soviet Union in September 1974. For the 1974–75 season, McLeod signed with the Vancouver Blazers where he appeared in a league record 72 games. McLeod followed the franchise to Calgary and for the next two seasons was the Calgary Cowboys main goalie. When that franchise folded in 1977, McLeod was drafted by the Quebec Nordiques, where he played in only 7 games before being dealt to the Edmonton Oilers where he finished out the 1977–78 season and his professional career.

McLeod was the holder of numerous WHA career, season and playoff goaltending records. He died in 2015, aged 68.

Career statistics

Regular season and playoffs

International

References

External links
 

1946 births
2015 deaths
Baltimore Clippers players
Calgary Cowboys players
Canadian ice hockey goaltenders
Detroit Red Wings players
Edmonton Oilers (WHA) players
Edmonton Oil Kings (WCHL) players
Fort Worth Wings players
Houston Aeros (WHA) players
Ice hockey people from British Columbia
Muskegon Zephyrs players
Philadelphia Flyers players
Providence Reds players
Quebec Aces (AHL) players
Quebec Nordiques (WHA) players
Richmond Robins players
Springfield Kings players
Sportspeople from Trail, British Columbia
Vancouver Blazers players